Villa City is a former community in  Lake County, Florida that is now a ghost town. It was a citrus growing area in the late 19th century with dozens of homes and a post office until it got hit by a hard freeze in February 1895. A historical marker is located in the area commemorating Villa City. There is also a Villa City Road.

Villa City was founded by George T. King of Massachusetts. A master plan for a new community in the area has been developed.

Its coordinates are 28°37.1'N 81°51.1'W.

See also
List of ghost towns in Florida

References

Former populated places in Lake County, Florida
Ghost towns in Florida